The Sherbrooke Hussars is a Primary Reserve armoured regiment of the Canadian Forces and perpetuates the Sherbrooke Fusilier Regiment of the Second World War.

Lineage

The Sherbrooke Regiment

The Sherbrooke Regiment was initially formed on 21 September 1866 in Melbourne, Quebec as the Sherbrooke Battalion of Infantry, becoming the 53rd (Sherbrooke) Battalion in 1867. The regiment perpetuates the Frontier Light Infantry as well as the 1st and 4th battalions of the Eastern Township District (1812–1815) from the War of 1812. As a result, the regiment carries the Theatre Battle Honour, Defence of Canada 1812–15, in recognition of the service rendered by the Frontier Light Infantry at the Battle of Lacolle Mills (1814).

On 22 March 1867, it was reorganized as two separate battalions designated the 53rd Melbourne Battalion of Infantry and the 54th Sherbrooke Battalion of Infantry.  It was redesignated as the 53rd Sherbrooke Battalion of Infantry on 10 May 1867 and then the 53rd Sherbrooke Regiment on 8 May 1900

The regiment provided volunteers for the 12th Battalion, Canadian Expeditionary Force in 1914. The following year, it provided men to the 117th (Eastern Townships) Battalion, CEF.  After proceeding overseas the 117th was broken up to provide reinforcements for several other Canadian units serving France.

In 1920, the Sherbrooke Regiment was reformed with two battalions – the 1st Battalion perpetuated the traditions of the 117th CEF. 
Following the Great War, the regiment was renamed The Sherbrooke Regiment on 29 March 1920 and re-roled as a machine gun battalion as The Sherbrooke Regiment (MG) on 15 December 1936

In 1940, parts of the regiment amalgamated with Les Fusiliers de Sherbrooke to form the Sherbrooke Fusilier Regiment (27th Canadian Armoured Regiment) which was an armoured regiment, while the Sherbrooke Regiment continued as infantry.

After the end of the Second World War, The Sherbrooke Regiment re-roled as armour, becoming the 12th Armoured Regiment (Sherbrooke Regiment), perpetuating the traditions of the Sherbrooke Fusilier Regiment.  In 1957, large print advertisements encouraged recruits to join the Sherbrooke Regiment, as well as other units of 9 Militia Group.  At the time, there were no dispersed subunits.  In 1958, the number was dropped, and the regiment became The Sherbrooke Regiment (RCAC).

In 1965, it amalgamated with the 7th/11th Hussars to become The Sherbrooke Hussars.

7th/11th Hussars

The 7th/11th Hussars was formed in 1936 through the amalgamation of the 7th Hussars and 11th Hussars.  Recruits from the same area had formed the World War 1 overseas 5th Battalion, Canadian Mounted Rifles, CEF which despite the name was a mounted infantry unit, and the 7th/11th Hussars proudly perpetuated their legacy.  In 1940, 400 men of the 7th/11th Hussars were mobilized as infantry with the 1st Battalion, Royal Rifles of Canada. It was redesignated the 2nd (Reserve) Regiment, 7th/11th Hussars on 27 February 1941. The regiment itself became the 16th (Reserve) Armoured Regiment, before being disbanded in 1943, with its personnel absorbed by the 5th Canadian Armoured Division of I Canadian Corps.

Brigade Headquarters of 5 Canadian Armoured Brigade was nicknamed "Headquarters Squadron (7th/11th Hussars)", and saw service in the Italian and Northwest Europe campaigns.  Two HQ Sqn (7th/11th Hussars) members received periodic MBEs for their wartime service, Captain Robert Rutherford was brigade reconnaissance officer, and Squadron Serjeant (sic) Major Cecil Raven was de facto HQ RSM.

In 1946, the regiment was raised again in Canada, perpetuating the 16th Armoured Regiment, as 16th Reconnaissance Regiment (7th/11th Hussars), RCAC on 1 April 1946. It was redesignated the 7th/11th Hussars (16th Reconnaissance Regiment) on 4 February 1949. Converted to armour as the 7th/11th Hussars (16th Armoured Regiment) on 1 September 1954 and finally the 7th/11th Hussars on 19 May 1958.

Large-print advertisements in the local English- and French-language newspapers for 9th Militia Group units emphasized the dispersed catchment area of the 7th/11th in 1957.  Headquartered in Bury, subunits were reported in Scotstown, Cookshire, East Angus, Windsor Mills, Richmond and Danville.

On 15 February 1965, it was amalgamated with The Sherbrooke Regiment (RCAC) to form the Sherbrooke Hussars.

Lineage chart

Perpetuations

War Of 1812 

 Frontier Light Infantry and 1st and 4th battalions of the Eastern Township District (1812–1815).

The Great War 

 5th Battalion, Canadian Mounted Rifles, CEF is perpetuated by The Sherbrooke Hussars, through the 7th/11th Hussars as explained below.
 117th (Eastern Townships) Battalion, CEF is perpetuated by The Sherbrooke Hussars.
 163rd Battalion (French-Canadian), CEF is perpetuated by Les Fusiliers de Sherbrooke.

Eastern Townships' military legacies 
A significant number and distribution of local units were extant through the years.  Their perpetuations are complex and acknowledge presence of units rather than their arm of service.

The 26th Canadian Horse "Stanstead" Dragoons originated in Coaticook on 1 April 1910:  Headquarters and 'A Squadron' at Coaticook (previously known as E Squadron, 7th Hussars [No. 6 Company, 58th Compton Regiment, 1 February 1900); 'B Squadron' at Magog (D Squadron, 11th Hussars, 1 April 1905); 'C Squadron' at Stanstead ('A Squadron, 13th Scottish Light Dragoons [Troop of Cavalry at Stanstead, 23 February 1872]; and 'D Squadron' at Ayer's Cliff (E Squadron, 6th Duke of Connaught's Royal Canadian Hussars, 1 July 1903).  It was redesignated: '26th Stanstead Dragoons' on 3 September 1912 and postwar as 'The Eastern Townships Mounted Rifles'.  On 15 March 1920 it was reorganized as a two regiment unit with the 1st Regiment (5th Canadian Mounted Rifles Battalion, CEF) and a nul-strength reserve battalion.  The latter was disbanded, and the former was converted to artillery.  The perpetuation of the '5th Canadian Mounted Rifles Battalion (Eastern Townships Regiment), CEF' then transferred to the '7th/11th Hussars' and ultimately to the Sherbrooke Hussars.

On 15 December 1936 the Stanstead Dragoons were converted to artillery and redesignated '27th Field Brigade, RCA'.  Then over the next years, it was successively '27th (Reserve) Field Brigade, RCA', '27th (Reserve) Field Regiment, RCA', the '27th Field Regiment, RCA', and '27th Field Artillery Regiment, RCA' on 12 April 1960.  Finally, reduced to nil strength on 1 April 1970.  Before 1939, the brigade included four batteries: the 72nd Coaticook, 73rd Magog, 74th Stanstead and 75th Cowansville batteries.

The guidon of The Sherbrooke Hussars has, at its centre bottom, the device of the Royal Rifles of Canada to denote the honorary distinction battle honour for Hong Kong.

History

The First World War

Details of the 53rd Sherbrooke Regiment were placed on active service for local protective duty on 6 August 1914.

The 5th Battalion, Canadian Mounted Rifles, CEF was authorized on 7 November 1914 and raised from volunteers of the 7th and 11th (Canadian) Hussars from the Eastern Townships of Quebec.  The battalion embarked for Britain on 18 July 1915.  After a short period of training, it arrived in France on 24 October 1915, where it fought as part of the 2nd Brigade Canadian Mounted Rifles.  On 24 December 1915 it was redesignated the 5th Canadian Mounted Rifles and rolled into the 8th Canadian Infantry Brigade which was raised in December 1915 in France from six Mounted Rifles regiments that were converted into infantry units, forming four infantry battalions. After this, the brigade took part in most of the major actions fought by the Canadians on the Western Front for the next two-and-a-half years until the armistice in November 1918.  5th CMR was disbanded on 30 August 1920.

One of the most notable members of the regimental family was George Harold Baker, MP for Brome.  Elected as a Conservative on 21 September 1911, in 1915 he raised the 5th Canadian Mounted Rifles, took them overseas and led them into action in France.  He was killed in action at Ypres on 2 June 1916.  LCol Baker is the only Member of Parliament to be killed in military action while serving as an MP.  Previously, George Baker was Lieutenant-Colonel of The 13th Scottish Light Dragoons.

The other notable member of the regimental family was George Randolph Pearkes, VC.  Major George Pearkes was awarded the Victoria Cross for his bravery at Passchendaele October 30–31, 1917.  George Pearkes was born in England in 1883, and immigrated to Western Canada in 1906. He joined the Canadian Expeditionary Force during WW1, and joined 5CMR in September 1916.  During the Battle of Passchendaele, despite a leg wound, he led some of his men through heavy enemy fire across open ground to capture a strategically located farm. For more than a day, they fought off numerous counter-attacks.  He served again during the Second World War, was later a federal cabinet minister and the Lieutenant-Governor of British Columbia.

The 117th (Eastern Townships) Battalion, CEF, which was authorized on 22 December 1915, even though it began recruiting as early as 5 November and embarked for Britain on 14 August 1916.  Not without protest, by mid-November 1916 the men of the 117th Battalion were being drafted, or transferred, into other battalions. In November 1916, the first draft saw over 100 men joining the ranks of 5th CMR. These would be the first 117th Battalion soldiers to serve in France and would spend Christmas Day 1916 in the trenches. A later draft saw another 165 men transferred to the 5th CMR giving them some solace in serving with a somewhat homegrown battalion, and they were initiated into the front lines by the end of January 1917.  The 117th provided reinforcements until 8 January 1917 when its personnel were absorbed by the 23rd Reserve Battalion, CEF.  The 117th was formally disbanded on 30 August 1920.

First World War battles

Battle honours in small capitals are for large operations and campaigns and those in lowercase are for more specific battles. Bold type indicates honours authorized to be emblazoned on the regimental guidon.

MOUNT SORREL 2–13 June 16, (Battle of Hill 62) was a local operation by three divisions of the British Second Army and three divisions of the German 4th Army.  It was also 8th Canadian Infantry Brigade's first action.  Located in the Ypres Salient, 3 kilometres (1.9 mi) east of Ypres, Belgium and 1,100 m (1,200 yd) from Hill 60, the battle took place along a ridge between Hooge and Zwarteleen in a smaller area called the Wieltje Salient.  It was notable that the brigade commander Brigadier General Victor Williams was captured, and 5th CMR's commanding officer Lieutenant-Colonel Baker, Member of Parliament, was killed in action.  Baker is buried at Poperinghe New Military Cemetery.

SOMME 1916, 1 July-18 November 16, also known as the Somme Offensive, was fought by the armies of the British Empire and French Third Republic against the German Empire. It took place on both sides of the upper reaches of the River Somme in France. The battle was intended to hasten a victory for the Allies. More than three million men fought in the battle and one million men were wounded or killed, making it one of the deadliest battles in human history.

Flers-Courcelette 15-22 Sep 16 was two and a half months into the Battle of the Somme.  By that stage, the objective was a west-east line between the villages of Courcelette and Flers.  The 8th Infantry Brigade with 5th CMR were on the left of 3rd Canadian Division's front providing flank protection, and was also successful in its attack in front of Mouquet Farm.  In all, Flers-Courcelette had been far more successful than any British operation during the previous two months. If the employment of tanks had been premature, work was continuing on other weapons and methods.

Ancre Heights	1 October-11 November 16, is the name given to the continuation of British attacks after the Battle of Thiepval Ridge from 26 to 28 September during the Battle of the Somme. The battle was conducted by the Reserve Army (renamed Fifth Army on 29 October) from Courcelette near the Albert–Bapaume road, west to Thiepval on Bazentin Ridge.  5CMR was on the extreme right of 3rd Division flanking 2nd Division. 4th and 5th CMR were to block off Regina Trench from German counter-attacks from the west. Both battalions, met heavy machine gun fire as soon as they left their own trenches. Uncut German wire was a major hindrance to the advance, and one company was virtually eliminated between the opposing trenches. Part of one company reached Regina Trench but was overwhelmed and destroyed. The left forward company of the 5th CMR managed to reach the objective also, established a blocking position, but were driven out early on the morning of 2 October by continuous counter-attacks. Another assault company was impeded by wire and machine gun fire and recorded only 15 survivors, the rest either killed or captured.

ARRAS, 1917, 8 Apr-4 May 17 (also known as the Second Battle of Arras) was a British offensive. From 9 April to 16 May 1917, British troops attacked German defences near the French city of Arras on the Western Front. The British achieved the longest advance since trench warfare had begun, surpassing the record set by the French Sixth Army on 1 July 1916.

Vimy Ridge, 1917, 9-12 Apr 17 was part of the Battle of Arras, in the Nord-Pas-de-Calais region of France. The main combatants were the four divisions of the Canadian Corps in the First Army, against three divisions of the German 6th ArmyBattle of Vimy Ridge order of battle. The battle took place at the beginning of the Battle of Arras, the first attack of the Nivelle Offensive which was intended to attract German reserves from the French, before their attempt at a decisive offensive on the Aisne and the Chemin des Dames ridge further south.

HILL 70, 15–25 August 1917 was fought between the Canadian Corps and four divisions of the German 6th Army along the Western Front on the outskirts of Lens in the Nord-Pas-de-Calais region of France between 15 and 25 August 1917.  Lens is immediately north of Vimy Ridge.  The lessons of Vimy Ridge were well known to the planning staff, and the battle was fought by many of the officers and men.

YPRES, 1917 31 July-10 November 17; also known as the Battle of Passchendaele, was a British campaign from July to November 1917, for control of the ridges south and east of the Belgian city of Ypres in West Flanders, as part of a strategy decided by the Allies at conferences in November 1916 and May 1917.

The First Battle of Passchendaele was fought west of Passchendaele village. The British had planned to capture the ridges south and east of the city of Ypres. Passchendaele lay on the last ridge 5 mi (8.0 km) from the railway junction at Roulers, which was an important part of the supply system of the German 4th Army.  During this battle, although wounded, Major George R Pearkes, 5th Canadian Mounted Rifles, age 29 years old and an acting major earned the Victoria Cross(VC) for most conspicuous bravery and skillful handling of the troops under his command during the capture and consolidation of considerably more than the objectives allotted to him, in an attack.

AMIENS 8–11 August 1918, also known as the Third Battle of Picardy was the opening phase of the Allied offensive, later known as the Hundred Days Offensive.  The push ultimately led to the end of the First World War. Allied forces advanced over 11 kilometres (7 mi) on the first day, one of the greatest advances of the war, with Gen Henry Rawlinson's British Fourth Army (with 9 of its 19 divisions supplied by the fast moving Australian Corps of Lt Gen John Monash and Canadian Corps of Lt Gen Arthur Currie) playing the decisive role.

Scarpe 1918 26–30 August 1918, was part of the Hundred Days Offensive. On the first day, 26 August, the Canadian Corps advanced over 5 kilometers and captured the towns of Monchy-le-Preux and Wancourt.  Lt. Charles Smith Rutherford VC MC MM of 5 CMR performed actions that would earn him the Victoria Cross(VC). He captured a German party of 45, including two officers and three machine-guns, then captured another pill-box along with another 35 prisoners and their guns.

ARRAS 1918 26 August – 3 September 1918, also known as The Second Battle of the Somme of 1918 was fought in the basin of the River Somme. It was part of a series of successful counter-offensives in response to the German Spring Offensive, after a pause for redeployment and supply.

HINDENBURG LINE, 12 September – 9 October 1918, which included the Battle of St. Quentin Canal.  As German defences collapsed and the army withdrew, the Allies planned a series of concentric attacks on the Germans (sometimes referred to as the Grand Offensive).  Each axis of advance was designed to cut German lateral communications.  The main German positions were anchored on the so-called Hindenburg Line, a series of defensive fortifications stretching from Cerny on the Aisne river to Arras.

The Battle of St. Quentin Canal was a pivotal battle and involved British, Australian and American forces operating as part of the British Fourth Army. Further north, part of the British Third Army, south of the Fourth Army's 19 km (12 mi) front, was the French First Army's 9.5 km (6 mi) front. The objective was to break through one of the most heavily defended stretches of the German Siegfriedstellung (Hindenburg Line), which in this sector included the St. Quentin Canal as part of its defences. The assault achieved its objectives (though not according to the planned timetable), resulting in the first full breach of the Hindenburg Line, in the face of heavy German resistance.
 
Canal du Nord 27 Sep 2 October 1918, was a continuation of the Hundred Days Offensive by the Allies  against German positions. The battle took place along an incomplete portion of the Canal du Nord and on the outskirts of Cambrai. To prevent the Germans from sending reinforcements against one attack, the assault along the Canal du Nord was part of a sequence of Allied attacks at along the Western Front.

Cambrai, 1918 8-9 Oct 18 (also known as the Second Battle of Cambrai) was a battle took place in and around the French city of Cambrai. The battle incorporated many of the newer tactics of 1918, in particular tanks. The attack was an overwhelming success with light casualties in an extremely short amount of time.

VALENCIENNES	1-2 November 1918 was part of the Hundred Days Offensive on 1 and 2 November 1918, it resulted in the capture of Valenciennes from the Germans by Canadian and British forces.  The city formed an anchor point for the so-called Hermann Line, and after it came under punishing Canadian artillery fire, over 1800 prisoners surrendered to the attacking Canadian battalions.

SAMBRE 4 November 1918, was part of the final European Allied offensives of World War I.  German resistance was falling away. Unprecedented numbers of prisoners were taken in the Battle of the Selle, and a new attack was quickly prepared. The French First Army and the British First, Third, and Fourth Armies were tasked with advancing along a 30-mile (48 km) front toward Maubeuge-Mons. Together with the American forces breaking out of the forests of Argonne, the attack disrupted German efforts to reform a shortened defensive line along the Meuse. By aggressively pursuing retreating formations, two Canadian divisions were able to roll up three different defensive lines.

FRANCE AND FLANDERS 1915-18.

The Western Front was the main theatre of war for Canada during the First World War. Following the outbreak of war in August 1914, the German Army opened the Western Front by invading Luxembourg and Belgium, then gaining military control of important industrial regions in France.

Between 1915 and 1917 there were several offensives along this front. The attacks employed massive artillery bombardments and massed infantry advances. Entrenchments, machine gun emplacements, barbed wire and artillery repeatedly inflicted severe casualties during attacks and counter-attacks and no significant advances were made.

The unstoppable advance of the Allied armies during the Hundred Days Offensive of 1918 caused a sudden collapse of the German armies and persuaded the German commanders that defeat was inevitable. The German government surrendered in the Armistice of 11 November 1918, and the terms of peace were settled by the Treaty of Versailles in 1919.

Joint mobilization of Sherbrooke Fusilier Regiment

Common naming errors

Early in the Second World War, the Sherbrooke Fusiliers Regiment was formed with men from Les Fusiliers de Sherbrooke and the Sherbrooke Regiment.  The community spirit favoured units formed by volunteers who would carry the honour of their hometown.  Shortly after establishment, the spelling was changed to "Fusilier", as Sherbrooke Fusilier Regiment.  This singular form of the name is on the cap badge and shoulder title.  Its Royal Canadian Armoured Corps lineage, battle honours and armoured traditions are perpetuated by the Sherbrooke Hussars through the Sherbrooke Regiment.  Les Fusiliers de Sherbrooke is an infantry regiment and shares the battle honours.

Further evidence of the singular form of the regimental name is found on the metal cap badge, which consists of a flaming grenade and a banner with the motto  in French.  The motto and the bomb were borrowed from Les Fusiliers de Sherbrooke.  In the centre is a horse's head surrounded by the words "Sherbrooke Fusilier Regiment".  The horse was found on the family coat of arms of Sir John Coape Sherbrooke, namesake of the home city.

The official Canadian Forces names must not be translated haphazardly.  After GO 42/41 and GO 62/41, the name 'Fusiliers' changed from the plural to the singular 'Fusilier' form. Therefore, only during 1940 was the regimental name plural.

Both the Sherbrooke Hussars and Les Fusiliers de Sherbrooke share the Second World War battle honours of the 27th Armoured Regiment (The Sherbrooke Fusilier Regiment).  However, the Sherbrooke Hussars perpetuate the armoured corps lineage.

The naming conventions of the Canadian Army can be confusing.  Regular Force armoured and infantry units are not usually named for a location, because personnel are drawn from across the country.  Artillery and engineer units are almost always numbered, but may carry a distinctive nickname.  Reserve armoured and infantry units generally are named, and may have a number if it has historical significance.  In wartime, units raised for the duration of the war tend to be numbered with a local name added for identity.

During the Second World War, The Sherbrooke Fusilier Regiment was the 27th Armoured Regiment.  The number 27 having no particular significance, and the unit was demobilized in 1946.  That same year, the Sherbrooke Regiment was renamed the 12th Armoured Regiment (Sherbrooke Regiment).  Again the number 12 meant nothing.  Numbers 12 and 27 which had been associated with Sherbrooke units were issued to other units.  In 1954, the Elgin Regiment, which was known as the 25th Armoured Delivery Regiment in the Second World War, and had coincidentally served in close cooperation with the Sherbrooke Fusilier Regiment, was renamed the Elgin Regiment (27th Armoured Regiment).  Why the number 25 was not reactivated is unknown.  In 1968, only a few years after The Sherbrooke Hussars was formed with the merger of The Sherbrooke Regiment and the 7th/11th Hussars, itself numbered as the 16th, the number 12 was issued to the 12e Régiment blindé du Canada.  The 12eRBC was raised as a francophone Regular Force armoured regiment adopting the badge and customs of 12th Armoured Regiment (Three Rivers Regiment).  The wartime Three Rivers Regiment was reconstituted in 1947 as the 24th Armoured Regiment (Three Rivers Regiment) as a reserve unit, and in 1968 assumed a new identity also as the 12eRBC.

A new regiment is formed

The Sherbrooke Regiment mobilized the No. 1 General Base Depot, Canadian Active Service Force, on 1 September 1939, which embarked for Britain on 25 January 1940 where it provided guards for vulnerable points until disbanded on 6 July 1940. The city-based regiment then, in conjunction with Les Fusiliers de Sherbrooke, mobilized The Sherbrooke Fusilier Regiment, CASF, for active service on 24 May 1940. In later years, a well-regarded senior officer described the Fusiliers in those years as perhaps the most unusual regiment in the army. While it later became entirely English-speaking, at that time it had French-speaking Catholics in two companies and English-speaking Protestants in the other two. The adjutant was Jewish. The commander could not speak French while at least one of the senior officers could not speak English.

It was redesignated as the "1st Battalion, The Sherbrooke Fusilier Regiment, CASF", on 7 November 1940, then as the "1st Battalion, The Sherbrooke Fusilier Regiment, CASF", on 15 November 1940 and upon conversion to an armoured regiment, as the "27th Armoured Regiment (The Sherbrooke Fusilier Regiment), CAC, CASF", on 26 January 1942 and "27th Armoured Regiment (The Sherbrooke Fusilier Regiment), RCAC, CASF" on 2 August 1945. In the case of the overseas unit 'Fusilier' is always in the singular.  The regiment served overseas initially in Newfoundland from 13 August 1941 to 15 February 1942, and embarked for Britain on 27 October 1942.  After selection as a tank regiment, The "Sherbrookes" as they called themselves became part of the 2nd Canadian Armoured Brigade.

Rather than detail all other units raised in the Sherbrooke area, it is worth highlighting the 2nd (Reserve) Battalion, The Sherbrooke Regiment which was designated on 7 November 1940.  Across Canada, Non-Permanent Active Militia units formed a recruiting base and community focus.  For example, during the Great War (1914–1918) replacement soldiers were formed into new battalions for the front.  LCol Bertram Dawson Lyon (1905–1986) was already a long-serving Militia officer when he was named Commanding Officer in 1943.  Typical of the expectations of the community, he supported his family through his business and also served in the Militia.  When war broke out, he volunteered for active service with the Sherbrooke Regiment, and shipped out for England with the 27th Armoured.  He was seriously injured in training in 1942, and repatriated to Canada as unfit for duty.  However, his experience was put to use as Commanding Officer of the 2nd (Reserve) Battalion from 1943 to 1946.

Lieutenant-Colonel Melville "Mel" Burgoyne Kennedy Gordon (1905–1974) was commanding officer from 1943 to 1945.  He graduated from the University of Toronto in 1926, and was in their Canadian Officers' Training Corps from 1922 to 1924.  He was commissioned as a lieutenant to the Governor General's Body Guard in 1924, where he served until 1928. That year he changed affiliation to the Princess Louise Dragoon Guards in Ottawa, where he rose to captain and major. From 1931 Gordon practiced law in Ontario and Quebec, and returned to the legal profession after the war.  In 1941 as a trained major, Gordon was posted to the 12th Armoured Regiment (Three Rivers Regiment) at Camp Borden, Ontario. He was officer commanding "B" Squadron in Canada and in England until January 1943. At that time, Gordon was promoted to lieutenant-colonel and given command of the 27th Armoured Regiment (Sherbrooke Fusilier Regiment).

A well-liked and respected leader, Lieutenant-Colonel Gordon led the regiment through training in preparation for the D-Day landings, then in combat through France, Belgium and the Netherlands. Gordon's regimental headquarters Sherman is noted in the regimental war diaries as the first tank into the liberated French town of Caen. He was immediately inducted to the Distinguished Service Order (DSO) in the field in Belgium. Uncharacteristic of most Canadian combat leaders, Gordon retained his command despite heavy losses, setbacks, and the challenges throughout the Northwest European campaign.  In the 2021 regimental history by Col (retd) Daniel Braün, Gordon is described as having a cool, calm, and timbered (sic) voice, which over wireless had reassuring effects on the soldiers.  In December 1945 and prior to demobilization, Gordon was promoted colonel.  At some point after the war, he was promoted brigadier.

Not every soldier who enrolled in the SFR in 1940 was necessarily still on strength on 6 June 1944.  With each change of arm of service from infantry to tank to armoured, the establishment expanded or contracted.  Individual soldiers were examined by selection boards for their suitability or willingness to serve in the new role.  Commanders paid close attention to medical standards to remove soldiers and officers who were unfit or unlikely to fully recover from accidents or illness.  Some men preferred to stay in the infantry left the unit.  In other cases, officers, NCOs and man whose language skills limited their employment in what became an English-speaking unit were sent to Depot.  In return, replacements were taken on strength continuously, and trained in the new skills.  The cycle was almost continuous.

Similar to the expectation on the soldiers and officers to excel, there was command pressure on the unit to form into a competent functioning and efficient fighting regiment.  Virtually nonstop visits, inspections, testing, competitions, training courses and schools, and interminable exercises drilled the lessons into all ranks.  For example, there were timed contests to load the tanks onto the LSTs and improvements were identified, such as when it was most practical to drive the tanks in reverse and who should give directions.  In the beginning the exercises were learn-as-you-go with debriefs and learning conferences in the evenings or afterwards.  Anyone called out for failing to improve could expect to be relieved or replaced.  In the UK, neutral umpires monitored exercises and interjected changes or casualties to test reactions.

From 1940 to 1945, the Sherbrookes operated the following vehicle types: Universal or BREN Carriers; Valentine tanks in Debert, NS; 6-Pdr Ram tanks; Humber Scout Cars; Grant tanks; Sherman Mk III (M4A2) tanks; Firefly tanks; Stuart tanks; Anti-aircraft tanks; as well as the typical Jeeps, motorcycles, 8-Cwt trucks, 15-Cwt trucks, 30-Cwt trucks, 3-ton trucks, a water truck, staff cars, and station wagons.  The Ram tanks were well suited for crew training in Canada and England even though they differed from the Shermans, which only started to be delivered in August 1943.

The DDay landing establishment of tanks was RHQ 4 Shermans, HQ Sqn 6 anti-aircraft 'Cruiser' tanks and 11 Stuarts; three fighting squadron HQs 3 Shermans including 1 'rear link' equipped, and 5 troops of 3 Shermans or Fireflies each.  In the first days after the invasion, the Fireflies were assigned to Troop Leaders, which was led to disastrous casualty rates in the junior officers.  The personnel establishment was 37 officers and 661 other ranks, short by one officer and 14 other ranks.

Second World War Battles

From D-Day, when the Allies landed on the beaches of Normandy until the German unconditional surrender in May 1945, the First Canadian Army under General Harry Crerar fought in seven major battle campaigns. These included: the Normandy Landings, the capture of Caen, closing the Falaise Gap, clearing the coastal ports, clearing the Scheldt Estuary, invading the Rhineland and the liberation of the Netherlands.  One very readable discussion of the Normandy campaign was published as a 1997 McGill University PhD Thesis by LCol (retd) Roman J. Jarymowycz.

Normandy Landings (6 June 1944)

The narrative of D Day has been well recorded, but the subsequent battles tend to be underreported.  The 27th Armoured Regiment (Sherbrooke Fusilier Regiment) (SFR), loaded their Landing Craft, Tank in Ostend, UK on 3 June.  The regiment was equipped with waterproofed Sherman and Sherman Firefly tanks, pulling "Porpoise" sledges filled with supplies.  After a 24hr weather pause, they landed to the west of Bernières-sur-Mer of Juno Beach just after noon on 6 June 1944 with the 9th Canadian Infantry Brigade (CIB).  The SFR was their assigned tank force to exploit through the bridgehead created by the assault infantry and tanks of the 8th CIB.  The beach was congested with other troops, and progress was slow getting inland to their assembly area near Beny-sur-Mer.

With about 3 hours of daylight remaining and three companies of North Nova Scotias riding on their tanks, the SFR passed through the assault battalions’ forward lines and fought their way southward toward their preplanned D-Day objectives.  The North Nova Scotia's reached Villons-les-Buissons by dusk and ran into more German resistance.  When it was evident that their objectives were still about four miles beyond near Carpiquet, they formed all-around defences around La Mare for the night.  Behind them the brigade was fighting bypassed German positions in the assembly area.

Authie (7–8 June 1944)
Starting from their exposed but advanced positions, on 7 June a force including all SFR squadrons pushed out in four prongs towards a cluster of villages south of Villons and Les Buissons, including Buron and Authie; A Sqn right, HQ and C Sqn centre, B Sqn left, and Recce Troop exploring the enemy's rear area.  The advance-to-contact included tank-on-tank combat.  Significant numbers of German half-tracks and other lighter armoured vehicles were destroyed.  The SFR lost several tanks including most of the Fireflies which were commanded by junior officers.  A number of men were killed, wounded, missing and captured.  Twenty-three Canadian prisoners including six SFR soldiers were killed by their captors at the Ardenne Abbey massacre. After the war, the German commander Brigadefuhrer Kurt Meyer was convicted of war crimes.

The SFR's Anglican padre Capt Walter L Brown, Bishop's University, Huron University College of Orillia was one of two Canadian padres killed in Normandy.  After landing on the 6th and throughout the day of the 7th, Brown was helping the medical officer at the regimental aid post.  On the evening of 7 June, he responded to a message that, "the padre is needed at the front".  Travelling by Jeep, Brown, his batman and driver Lt Grainger, and a passenger LCpl Greenwood, turned a corner and immediately encountered a German patrol.  There was an exchange of fire.  Greenwood was killed and Grainger was injured.  Brown was seen surrendering and later reported missing.  His body was identified on 10 July at a casualty collection point.  The regimental padre observed marks on his chest suggesting Brown was possibly bayonetted by his captors.

The battle did not change the front substantially.  However, this action and the next month of skirmishing blunted half an enemy division, prevented them from attacking into the beachhead, and remained a preoccupation for the German leadership.  B Sqn started with fifteen tanks and ended with five, including "Bomb".  The SFR and the North Nova Scotia Highlanders are the only Canadian units with the Authie battle honour.

Caen (8–9 July 1944) Operation Charnwood

The advance to Caen renewed in early July 1944.  To the West the Americans had cleared large areas of western Normandy and pushed out of their bridgeheads.  Although the Canadian and British divisions were strong, the thick hedges of Normandy favoured the defenders, especially around Caen.  If anything, the comparative stalemate kept the Germans from moving troops away from Caen.

The battle of Orne began when the Canadians pushed out to the towns of Buron and Gruchy.  Two SFR squadrons were attached to two battalion-strength infantry battlegroups.  Once into the village of Buron, A Sqn's tanks helped the infantry fight house to house.  The German defenders stubbornly fought to the last man rather than withdraw.  On the afternoon of 7 July, the SFR and two British M10 self-propelled anti-tank gun troops destroyed 14 counterattacking tanks.  By nightfall on the 8th, A Sqn's five remaining tanks had the high ground south of Buron.  By 9 July the German defences outside Caen collapsed.  The SFR CO himself (LtCol Mel Gordon) and his HQ were the first tanks into Caen.

Crossing the Orne

While somewhat anticlimactic compared to other battles, the assault crossing of the Orne River by SFR tanks provided hard-pressed infantry battalions with much needed close support as they struggled to secure the crossing in depth.

Official war artist Major Will Ogilvie produced a dramatic panchromatic watercolour of the tanks, entitled, "Tanks of the 27th Canadian Armoured Regiment (The Sherbrooke Fusilier Regiment) Cross the Orne Near Caen by Ferry, 19 July 1944".  Modern-day researchers, writing in French, have identified numerous crossings pushed by Canadian engineers over the Orne River, including photo comparisons to the Ogilivie work.

Faubourg de Vaucelles

The Canadian infantry continued their fight clearing the Faubourg de Vaucelles suburb of Caen, south of the Orne River.  Just as the SFR's tanks reinforced the infantry, the enemy's withdrawal allowed them to harden their defences, which could have been disastrous for the attackers.  The battle turned when a strong British force hooked around behind the built-up area from the northeast and linked up with the Canadians.

Bourguébus Ridge

As high command pressure grew for bolder strategic gains, the Canadians were grouped into larger and larger manoeuver formations.  Over two weeks’ of fighting in mid-July, Canadian infantry were thrown toward the small towns and dominating high features south of Caen, including Verrières Ridge.  Available tank squadrons were paired with attacking battalions.  The SFR's battles were between the Orne River and nearby Bourgébus Ridge.  Across the division's frontage, Canadian casualties were very heavy.  When the SFR was pulled back, A Sqn was down to six tanks and the other squadrons not much better.  While the overall operation did not achieve all of its objectives, the Germans had had to contain aggressive attacks across a wide front and were left so badly weakened that the next battles were decisive.

Operation Totalize and 7–9 August 1944 

During Operation Totalize, A Sqn commanded by Major Sydney Radley-Walters was in a support position with six 75 mm Shermans and two 17-pounder Sherman Fireflies in a walled Chateau compound 44 near Gaumesnil.  SS-Hauptsturmführer Michael Wittmann, known as the "Black Baron", led a heavily armoured counterattack on 8 August attempting to drive a seam between British and Canadian formations. The SFR tanks were placed behind the chateau's stone walls with holes knocked out for firing positions.  The tanks were about 300m broadside to the German platoon's axis of advance. When they opened fire, the Canadian tanks destroyed two Tiger I tanks, two Panzer IVs and two self-propelled guns while British tank fire destroyed three other Tigers. The German counterattack collapsed.  At the time, the tank crew doctrine was to attack the most dangerous target first.  A British Firefly crew later claimed to have killed Wittmann and his crew in their Tiger I tank.  However, proximity and forensic examination of the holes more strongly supports that he was killed by the Sherbrooke tanks.

The intensity of the break-out battles can be seen in the number of replacement vehicles that had to be brought forward.  At the beginning of August the 27th Canadian Armoured Regiment had 63 fit Sherman 75mm and Firefly 17-Pounder tanks.  In the next two-and-a-half weeks, 23 were lost or damaged by enemy action, and half of those were repairable.  Thirteen more were out of action for 2nd line maintenance, or work that was beyond the immediate capability of the unit's mechanics or facilities.  Two were in 1st line maintenance, or temporarily out of the line for manageable repairs.  Thirteen replacement tanks were received, either newly arrived from stocks in UK or repaired from battlefield salvage.  Therefore, on 18 August, the SFR could field 38 fit tanks not including the two at the regimental Light Aid Detachment (LAD) on two-days availability.  Though not a perfect count, this was enough to theoretically field three squadrons of four troops. Each troop could field three tanks each, plus four for the headquarters squadron. Other regiments involved in heavy combat equally received large numbers of replacement tanks in short order.

Clair Tizon (10–14 August), The Liaison (14–16 August), Falaise (11–23 August), and Falaise Road

While the British and Canadians were holding the enemy in the east of the Normandy bridgehead, the Americans were able to break through German lines in the west.  Meanwhile, the Germans started moving in another Army Group and redeployed others to attack the Americans.  Seeing an opportunity to entrap the enemy, the Canadians were ordered to relentlessly drive south.

Clair Tizon was a series of infantry and tank engagements to capture bridges south of Caen.  After the massed infantry and armour attacks south from Caen, the Canadians were ordered to attack along a parallel axis as a way of diluting German defenders.  The Liaison was a series of leapfrog battles to clear a long narrow river valley further west of the Caen to Falaise road.  Infantry battalions were paired with squadrons from the 2nd Canadian Armoured Brigade to move past each other from one objective to the next.  The SFR was ordered in because it had worked feverishly to replace lost crews and tanks following its last battles.  Falaise was the bigger battle to close off two trapped German armies.

After reviewing the last two months of fighting, the commander of II Canadian Corps, Lieutenant General Guy Simonds decided that to keep the enemy off balance, he needed to leapfrog German lines with half-squadrons of tanks, mechanized engineers, self-propelled artillery and infantry in armoured personnel carriers, grouped into fighting columns.  Although highly classified in wartime, the Allies also had the German plans because of Top Secret intercepted signals decoded with ULTRA.

Column after column of Canadians fought day after day to wear down the German defences.  Nearby Polish and British divisions pressed hard.  The Americans formed a big hook that trapped the Germans in the Falaise Pocket.  Two SFR squadrons and their battalions actually entered the town of Falaise on 16 August.  By 21 August, SFR tanks and infantry of the Lincoln and Welland Regiment, closed one of the last routes in or out of the pocket near Hill 258 northeast of Trun, near Les Champeaux.  Nearly fifty thousand Germans were killed, wounded or captured.  The battle of Normandy was over, but the pursuit of retreating Germans had just begun.

Operation Kitten, Operation Paddle

The closure of the Falaise Gap brought dramatic enemy capture and destroyed numbers, but the enemy was far from defeated.  Their rearguard operations slowed the SFR and the various ever-changing brigades and regiments it supported.  In the weeks that followed, the SFR refitted with replacement tanks and crews, worked on lessons learned, and halted when ordered due to fuel shortages.

Clearing the Channel Coast

Antwerp-Tournout, Belgium (September and October 1944)

As the Germans retreated from France into Belgium and the Netherlands, Allied supply lines became longer.  The port of Antwerp was needed by the Allies to improve their logistics challenges, but the approaches to Antwerp were still controlled by the Germans.  The first step in a four-part battle was to clear the area north of Antwerp and secure access to South Beveland.

The SFR was attached to the I British Corps, with individual squadrons supporting different British infantry brigades' attacks.  Initially daily advances gained bridges and valuable ground between the dominating canals.   The operations were distinctive for the large numbers of disorganized prisoners taken while suffering limited friendly casualties.  Despite the teamwork of the British, Polish and Canadians to clear the banks of the Scheldt, the enemy consolidated their resistance along the only axis available. The fighting was fierce. The well-entrenched German forces made it difficult for the Allied Forces to advance.

The Scheldt (October and November 1944) Operation Switchback, Operation Vitality, and Operation Infatuate

Following the comparatively conventional battle for Antwerp, the action to clear the Scheldt Estuary was anything but simple.  Canadian and British forces, mostly infantry supported by artillery, and direct fire from tanks, struggled across terrible conditions to clear German defenders little by little from the shores and islands between Antwerp and the North Sea.  It was one of the most distressing periods for the Canadian Army in WW2.

The Lower Maas

Through November and December after the intense actions to clear the Scheldt, the Canadians were ordered to move towards the Meuse (Maas) delta, a comparatively quiet sector held by the American 82nd Airborne and replace a British Guards regiment, which gave the SFR time to rest and receive training on new techniques.  The front was still active, but generally static due to badly damaged roads, large flooded areas, and winter conditions.  Throughout January and February 1945, the whole regiment or individual squadrons were moved around the 2nd and 3rd Canadian Infantry Division areas, and were often assigned direct and indirect fire tasks against enemy positions.

In early January 1945, LtCol Gordon left the SFR and LtCol FT Jenner assumed command for the balance of the war.

The Rhineland and the Hochwald (February – March 1945) Operation Veritable

As late winter arrived, significant Canadian forces, with attached British divisions mounted Operations Veritable and Blockbuster to push into heavily defended German territory.  Once more, the SFR was parcelled out to attacking brigades and regiments to fight the infantry onto their objectives.  Mobility was hindered by sodden terrain, heavy forest, well-fortified defences and highly motivated defenders.  With the general disappearance of enemy armour and more conventional tank fighting, the SFR's role was characterized by shock and firepower for the infantry, whose progress was regularly aided by Kangaroo APCs, flail minesweeping tanks, and flame-throwing tanks.  Lesson learned from the costly Normandy campaigns.

Xanten (February – March 1945) Operation Blockbuster

As winter ended, the First Canadian Army intensified the drive to overwhelm and defeat the Germans, starting with pushing them out of the area between the Meuse (Maas) to the west and the Rhine to the north and against the Ninth US Army to the south.  The opening attack of Operation Blockbuster saw the 2nd Canadian Armoured Brigade including the SFR and Fort Garry Horse, with infantry battalions from the 6th Canadian Infantry Brigade riding on the tanks or in Kangaroos, attacking fiercely defending German positions.  The last objective was Xanten, achieved in early March after fighting which the official histories described as the most grim and gruelling of the war.

The Rhine  Liberation of Arnhem

The Rhine River was both a physical obstacle for the advancing Allied armies, but a psychological barrier for the defending Germans.  By establishing themselves on the eastern side of the Rhine, the Allies proved that they could control German territory and defeat the Third Reich.

Emmerich-Hoch Elten  (March – April 1945)

Working from a previously earned Canadian bridgehead, squadrons of the SFR supported Canadian infantry clearing the German town of Emmerich on the eastern shores of the Rhine River.  Even though this was a significant point of resistance for the Germans, the Canadians were well-practiced in their roles by this point in the war, and what might have been a weeks long set piece battle in Normandy was completed within days.  Hoch Elten is a local high feature which was strongly defended, but overtaken.

Zutphen (April 1945)

Once more, the SFR was dispatched to support attacking Canadian infantry battalions clearing resilient defenders.  Often carrying the foot soldiers on the tanks, the SFR provided direct and indirect fire against the enemy.  As each obstacle was encountered, the close fighting relationships between tank troops and squadrons, A Squadron in particular, with particular battalions saw enemy positions destroyed or forced their retreat.  Zutphen was notable for the close cooperation between pioneers and tankers to create small water crossings which were then successfully exploited.  The Zutphen battle honour was given to six infantry regiments and a reconnaissance unit, but the only armoured unit recipient was the SFR.

Deventer (April 1945)

Despite feelings that the war had been won, the enemy still showed resilience.  The Dutch town of Deventer was still stoutly defended.  Canadian infantry and a handful of SFR tanks from B Squadron engaged the enemy who quickly fled.  Although this was the last battle honour awarded the SFR, the remainder of April and May saw sharp enemy defensive actions and Canadian dashes to seize territory, with the associated drain on lives, men and material.

North-West Europe 1944–1945,

LtCol S. Radley-Walters assumed command in July 1945.  The Regiment was disbanded on 15 February 1946.

Tank Bomb

The most important regimental artifact is Bomb, a Sherman III tank (British Commonwealth designation of the M4A2 Sherman), War Department registration T152656, serial number 8007, built by Fisher as build number 898.  This tank survived from D-Day to VE-Day without being knocked out, an improbable achievement given the high casualty rate amongst front line combat equipment.  Between August 1943 when the regiment when received its first training-specific Shermans, and May 1944 when the full establishment was achieved, a steady stream of tanks arrived to replace the Rams and Grants used in training since 1942.  On 9 May 1944, 27 brand-new Shermans arrived.  LtCol Gordon had the squadron commanders flip a coin to see who would get these tanks.  Major Mahon's B Squadron won the toss, and in half a month the crews completely cleaned the preservative greases, emptied and restowed each tank, tuned the engines and replaced the rubber transport tracks for steel tracks.  Then, like every other tank in the regiment, these were waterproofed with the requisite clay, tar, putty and greases in preparation for the landing.  Barring further information, it is probable that Bomb was one of these new tanks received in May 1944.

Bomb crew, originally Troopers A.W. Rudolph, "Red" Fletcher, J.W. (Tiny) Hall, Lance-Corporal R. (Rudy) Moreault and Sergeant Harold Futter, crew commander, kept the tank in service, firing over 6,000 rounds and surviving at least one shell impact.  Futter was wounded in July 1944; he and one other man were replaced in Normandy by Lieutenant Paul Ayriss and Trooper Ken Jeroux.  Lieutenant J.W. Neill replaced Ayriss in August 1944, and was later awarded the Military Cross.  Two more officers to command Bomb were Lieutenant Walter White, who was wounded in April 1945, and Lieutenant Earnest Mingo, who replaced him until the war's end.

Bomb  was on display at the Champs de Mars Park, Queen Boulevard North, Sherbrooke, Quebec.  In 2003, it received expert refinishing and repainting in a two-week-long technical visit by Canadian Forces maintainers from CFB Valcarter.  Nevertheless, by 2011 that work had deteriorated, and Bomb was removed from her plinth.  Extensive cleaning and repainting with the correct markings was completed at 202 Workshop Depot in Longue-Pointe Garrison, and in September 2011 Bomb was relocated to the front lawns of the William Street Armoury in Quebec.

Few tanks are film stars.  Bomb was the subject of a Canadian Army Film and Photographic Unit production entitled Green Fields Beyond (number 2090) in 1945.  The script starts in England as the crew receives their Sherman III tank and christen it Bomb at the Sun Inn pub.  The tank is waterproofed for D-Day, loaded onto Landing Craft, and personal effects (letters, pay books, memorabilia and valuables) collected for security reasons.  The film includes footage Sergeant Bill Grant of the Canadian Film and Photographic Unit of the first wave landing at Bernieres-sur-Mer and Courseulles-sur-Mer.  Additional footage portrays the landings, the bridgehead, fighting, a medal's presentation by Montgomery, resting, the arrival of replacement crew members, captured enemy, artillery fire, and moving vehicles.  There is action footage of the Sherbrookes fighting at Falaise in August, Calcar in February, and into liberated Netherlands.  Two stand out scenes are maps showing the line of advance through France, Belgium, and in the Netherlands superimposed over actions, and Bomb turned-in but arriving at the Port of Halifax with the disembarking troops.

Hong Kong
In July 1940, the 7th/11th Hussars contributed about half its officers and men to The Royal Rifles of Canada which fought in Hong Kong.  From the elements not sent overseas, an armoured squadron was mobilized as the 2nd Canadian Armoured Brigade Headquarters Squadron (7th/11th Hussars) CASF on 27 February 1941.  It departed Canada for the United Kingdom on 9 October 1941, however it was disbanded effective 1 January 1943 and personnel were absorbed by Headquarters, 2nd Canadian Armoured Brigade.

Post amalgamation

Another new regiment is formed 

The history of The Sherbrooke Hussars from 1965 to present has been distinguished by success by surviving.  The Canadian Army doctrine changed in the 1950s from mobilizing units in Canada for overseas service, to maintaining standing forces in Europe.  As a NATO Charter signatory, Canada's focus was to support first the 27th Infantry Brigade in Germany and later 4th Canadian Mechanized Brigade.  The role of reserve units changed to training individual soldiers to augment the regular force.

On 15 February 1965, the 7th/11th Hussars was amalgamated with The Sherbrooke Regiment (RCAC).  The Sherbrooke Regiment's Sherman tanks were returned to stores.  Regimental headquarters was established in Sherbrooke, with 'A' and 'B' Squadrons.  Personnel from outlying areas were encouraged to commute for training.  On 5 July 1967, Queen Elizabeth II presented new colours (a guidon) on Parliament Hill in the presence of thousands of spectators.

Throughout the period, members of The Sherbrooke Hussars deployed on Exercise Reforger 'call-outs' to Germany, including a formed Jeep light armoured reconnaissance troop attached to the 8th Canadian Hussars.  Other operational deployment included United Nations missions in Middle East UNEF and UNDOF as support trades, such as drivers, Cyprus UNFICYP as peacekeepers, and extensively in the Former Yugoslavia UNPROFOR.  A member of the regiment, Corporal David Galvin, attached to 12eRBC, was killed when his Cougar armoured car rolled over on 29 November 1993.  Several members of the regiment served in Afghanistan, including at least one soldier who was wounded by an improvised explosive device.  Although individual contributions were significant, the regiment did not meet the detailed criteria for the Afghanistan theatre honours.  Elsewhere, personnel served in Haiti following the 2010 earthquake.

Reserve units in Canada face constant challenges of personnel attraction and retention.  Often an employer will be reluctant to allow a reservist to leave their job to attend extended training courses or an operational deployment.  One effort to reward cooperative employers has been through public recognition through the Canadian Forces Liaison Council.  In 2005, the Most Supportive Employer in Quebec was the federal Department of Citizenship and Immigration on behalf of their employee, Captain Simon Hallé of the Sherbrooke Hussars.

National Defence budgets have always set the tone for training and recruiting tempo.  For example, in April 2010, both the Sherbrooke Hussars and les Fusiliers de Sherbrooke were required to reduce their operating funds by 40% in the middle of their training year.

In 2019, the regiment perpetuates its Eastern Township roots as a bilingual unit in the Army Reserves.  As a member of the Armoured Corps, the Sher H trains for, among other things, mounted reconnaissance, convoy escort and vehicle checkpoint establishment using the TAPV and G Wagen.  Its unofficial motto is "see without being seen".

Through the Strengthening the Army Through the Reserves (StAR) project, it will be assigned a mission task, which is still in the analysis stage, to acquire chemical, biological, radiological and nuclear (CBRN) detection expertise.  Two additional Regular Force cadre were posted to Sherbrooke to facilitate the capacity.  Other units across Canada have been assigned significant mission tasks in three strategic approaches.  Currently validated missions include force protection, convoy escorts, Arctic response company groups, and territorial battalion groups; newly identified missions like infantry platoons, reconnaissance, direct fire support, assault pioneers, mortars, influence activities, persistent surveillance system, and long-haul trucking; and exploring future missions such as assault troop, light urban search and rescue, light engineer bridging, cyber threats.

The Sherbrooke Hussars has used a variety of operational vehicles:
  
- the Sherbrooke Regiment was issued late wartime-production M4A2 (76mm) Wet Stowage HVSS M4A2E8 Sherman tank (retired in 1963);

- the Cougar AVGP (Armoured Vehicle General Purpose);

- Canadian made GMC M135 -ton Cargo ("Deuce and a Half");

- Canadian made Dodge M37 -ton truck;

- the M38A1 -ton truck, the M151A2 -ton truck; and the Volkswagen Iltis -ton truck;

- Canadian made M35 series -ton 6×6 cargo truck known as the MLVW;

- Canadian-produced standard transmission, 12v, 4x4, 1-ton Dodge Power Wagon W200 trucks differing slightly from the American Commercial Utility Cargo Vehicle series; and,

- various -ton GM commercial vehicles Commercial Utility Cargo Vehicle;

The current service vehicle is the Mercedes G-Wagen -ton truck, and the operational support vehicle is the MilCots commercial pattern extended cab 4x4 truck.  There are six assigned for the echelon as fuel can hauler, ammo truck, squadron sergeant major's resupply and canteen, 1st line mechanic, and administration sergeant in place of the retired LSVW.  In fall 2017, the transition to a new vehicle began, the TAPV, 18-ton Textron Tactical Armoured Patrol Vehicle.

Armoury and training areas
Extracted from List of armouries in Canada

In the early 1950s the Sherbrooke Regiment acquired a parcel of land west of Sherbrooke near the village of St-Elie-d'Orford commonly known as McBain's Farm.  A hardstand and a small hangar were built to suit the tanks.  It provided off-road driving experiences for trainees, from open fields and sand pits, to overgrown farm fields, to dense brush and forested areas.  Over the years many Basic Training courses dug defensive trench lines and waited in the gloom of dawn to repel deliberate attacks, and practised compass marches through the swamps.  In the late 2000s, when land values had made McBain's attractive to developers, a land swap was made for a 73-hectare open field 8 km further west along Quebec Route 220, named Rutherford.  It is managed as a field training area by the Regular Force garrison at Farnham.

The question of maintenance on the William Street Armoury was asked of Prime Minister Justin Trudeau during his town-hall visits in January 2017.  In mid-February, the MP for Sherbrooke, Pierre-Luc Dusseault, sent a letter to the Minister of National Defence defending the institution of both armouries in Sherbrooke as historic buildings deserving of conservation, and signalling that the William Street Armoury is the one apparently in the poorest state of repair.

The outgoing commanding officer, Lieutenant Colonel L-B Dutil, said that moving the four regiments to the Belvedere Street Armoury was unlikely to proceed, "With the growth of the reserves, with the new vehicles that have arrived, and with other factors, it means that this option may not be the best, ... (translated from French)."  He also mentioned a visit in December 2017 by the Minister of National Defence, who acknowledged rushing a decision was not in anyone's interests.

Media in mid-June 2021 reported the William Street Armoury, which has sections built between 1839 and 1841, was found unsafe and would shortly be condemned.  Indications were the two occupying units will have one year to move. This news came only months after orders in March to close the Belvédère Street armoury, home of the Fusiliers de Sherbrooke and the 35th Signal Regiment, which had only two months notice to evacuate.  All four reserve units in Sherbrooke were abruptly looking for housing, either by saving one or both buildings or by building a brand-new building.  Late in 2021, both armouries had been evacuated and barricaded, citing unsafe conditions within.  Public and media interest in the buildings' future remained high.  Suspicions were raised that the four units would eventually be housed in a single facility outside the central core of Sherbrooke.

Alliances 
 – The Queen's Royal Hussars (Queen's Own and Royal Irish)
 – The Royal Anglian Regiment

Battle honours

Battle honours in small capitals are for large operations and campaigns and those in lowercase are for more specific battles. Bold type indicates honours authorized to be emblazoned on the regimental guidon.

The regiment did not contribute sufficient forces to meet the minimum level of 20 per cent of effective strength to qualify for the theatre honour “Afghanistan".

As mentioned elsewhere, the William Street Armoury has been closed pending an architectural review.  By tradition, the regimental guidon which normally is kept under glass in the Officer's Mess could not be left unattended.  In November 2022, Her Worship the Mayor of [Sherbrooke] accepted to display the guidon at Sherbrooke City Hall.

Honorary appointments

Honorary colonels

 The Sherbrooke Regiment and The Sherbrooke Hussars
 Colonel Edward Bruen Worthington, CMG VD 1937
 Colonel (Brigadier-General) J.H. Price, CC, OBE, MC, ED 1968
 Colonel Douglas Bradley
 Colonel Thomas Garfield Gould, MC
 Colonel J. Garneau, CD 2006
 Colonel (Lieutenant-General retired) Paul Addy, CMM, CD 
 Colonel (Maître) Sylvestre
 Colonel David Rothschild 
 The 7th/11th Hussars
 Major-General the Right Honourable J. E. B. Seely, CB, CMG, DSO 1920

Honorary lieutenant-colonels

 The Sherbrooke Regiment and The Sherbrooke Hussars
 Lieutenant-Colonel C.J. McCuaig 1913
 Lieutenant-Colonel E.B. Worthington 1926
 Lieutenant-Colonel A.A. Munster 1937
 Lieutenant-Colonel Alfred Lloyd Penhale 1958
 Lieutenant-Colonel (Brigadier-General) J.H. Price, CC, OBE, MC, ED
 Lieutenant-Colonel D. Bradley
 Lieutenant-Colonel D. Ross
 Lieutenant-Colonel J. Garneau CD 1991
 Lieutenant-Colonel Jacques F. Girardin CD 2006
 Lieutenant-Colonel Jean Vaillancourt
 Lieutenant-Colonel (Maître) Sylvestre
 Lieutenant-Colonel David Rothschild
 The 11th Hussars
 Colonel (Brigadier-General the Honourable) C.M. Nelles, CMG, RO 1921

Commanding officers and regimental sergeant majors

Commanding officers

 Lieutenant Colonel Harry Blue
 Lieutenant Colonel Jack Hawkins
 Lieutenant Colonel Jim Strickland (1967)
 Lieutenant Colonel Maurice "Moe" Jackson
 Lieutenant Colonel Ross Bishop (1976)
 Lieutenant Colonel Allan Marshall
 Lieutenant Colonel Gary Connors
 Lieutenant Colonel John Murray
 Lieutenant Colonel Alain Martineau, CD (to 1993)
 Lieutenant Colonel Ernie Garbutt, CD (from 1993)
 Lieutenant Colonel Daniel Braun (to 2000)
 Lieutenant Colonel Warren Sanderson (2000 to 2003)
 Lieutenant Colonel Alain Martineau (to 2008)
 Lieutenant Colonel Luc Tremblay (from 2008)
 Lieutenant Colonel Daniel Lamoureux (12eRBC) (2013 to 2015); subsequently commanding officer of Canadian Army Influence Activities Task Force in Kingston, ON (2015); Director of Army Reserve in Ottawa (2022)
 Lieutenant Colonel Louis-Benoit Dutil (2015 to 2018)
 Lieutenant Colonel J.A. Éric Beaudoin (2018–2021), former commanding officer of Les Fusiliers de Sherbrooke (2005 to 2010)
 Lieutenant Colonel Paul Langlais, CSM, MSM, CD, (2021–present), former commanding officer of Les Fusiliers de Sherbrooke (2002–2005) and The Royal Montreal Regiment (2011–2015)

Regimental sergeant majors

 Chief Warrant Officer George Lavigne
 Chief Warrant Officer Garth Bishop (1970)
 Chief Warrant Officer Ernie Kirby
 Chief Warrant Officer B.P. Bourque (1976)
 Chief Warrant Officer Jim Oakley
 Chief Warrant Officer Ryan Quinn
 Chief Warrant Officer Denis Gauthier
 Chief Warrant Officer Jeff George
 Chief Warrant Officer Christopher Galvin
 Chief Warrant Officer Brian Rowell (2002–04)
 Chief Warrant Officer Jacques Madore (2004–2008)
 Chief Warrant Officer Éric Decubber (2008–11)
 Chief Warrant Officer Sebastian Landry
 Master Warrant Officer J.S.B.M. (Mathieu) Giard (2015–18), promoted chief warrant officer and appointed regimental sergeant major of 2 Canadian Ranger Patrol Group 
 Chief Warrant Officer David Lapalme-Robitaille (2018–2021)
 Chief Warrant Officer Justin Dohler (2021–present)

Notable Sherbrookes

Including post-war service:
Brigadier-General Sydney Valpy Radley-Walters CMM, DSO, MC, CD,

Second World War Gallantry Awards:,

Officers

Rank /	Surname /	Names /	Decoration /	Immediate Or Periodic /	Date

Major	WALSH	Vincent Owen	DSO	Immediate 07 Jun 44
LtCol	GORDON	Melville (Mel) Burgoyne Kennedy	DSO	Immediate 08 Jul 44
Capt GOULD	Thomas Garfield	(Garry) MC	Immediate 26 Feb 45
Lt	NEILL	John Wesley	MC	Immediate 26 Feb 45 (Lt Neill was Crew Commander of Bomb when he received this award)
Major	HOUSTON	Ross Melvin	DSO	Periodic Jul 44 – Feb 45
Lt	CLOUT	Edward Albert	MC	Immediate 	03 Mar 45
Lt	WARRINER	Robert Alfred	MC	Immediate 29 Mar 45
Capt	SPAFFORD	Elliott	MC	Periodic Jun 44 – Mar 45
Lt	GOODWIN	George Douglas	MC	Immediate 28 Apr 45
Major	RADLEY-WALTERS	Sidney Valpy	DSO & MC 	Periodic Aug 44 – Apr 45 (see above)
Capt	BRENNAN	John Paul	MC	Immediate 28 Apr 45

Other Ranks

Rank /	Surname /	Names /	Decoration /	Immediate Or Periodic /	Date

Squadron Sergeant Major	NICHOLSON	Claude Linden	MM	Periodic 07 Jun 44
Sergeant	BEARDSLEY	Ralph Robert	MM	Immediate 08 Jul 44 (see note below)
Squadron Sergeant Major	HOWLAND	Ernest Arthur	MM	Periodic 13 Aug 44
Sergeant	CUDDIE	Lloyd William	MM	Immediate 22–24 Jul 44
Sergeant (RCEME)	SODEMAN	Eugene Frederick	  MM	Immediate 26 Feb 45 (As a member of 85 Light Aid Det att 27 Cdn Armd Regt)
Sergeant	BOWERS	Victor Ray	MM	Periodic 27 Feb 45
Trooper	SCHULER	Vernon Peter	MM	Immediate 08 Mar 45
Sergeant	RIGBY	Arthur	MM	Immediate 10 Apr 45
Lance Sergeant	CONNELL	Armond Thomas	MM	Immediate 23 Apr 45
Lance Corporal	DAVIS	Milton David	MM	Immediate 26 Apr 45
Trooper	BARLETT	David Douglas	MM	Periodic 14 Jun 45

Immediate award for a specific act of gallantry. 
Periodic Award. Not for a specific act, but can encompass gallant behaviour over a period of time or noteworthy service.

Sgt Ralph Robert Beardsley (1899-1982) was one of the unit's few combat veterans until the Normandy Landing.  He served overseas in the Great War, and in 1931 while working for the Standard Fruit and Steamship Company in Cabezas, Nicaragua, he and a US Marine officer took an armed party into the countryside to hunt a murderous band of Augustino Sandino's rebels.  Beardsley was rumoured to have fought in the Mackenzie-Papineau Brigade of the Spanish Civil War, but his name is not on their published nominal rolls.  He enrolled in Sherbrooke in 1939.  His WW1 war ribbons attracted the attention of King George VI and General Crerar when the regiment had an inspection in April 1944.  As the regiment advanced to its end-of-day objectives on 6 June, Beardsley and another tanker overcame a significant German position with hand grenades.  In July 1944 he was awarded an immediate Military Medal for acts of bravery in the field.  He was wounded on 2 Aug but recovered and was back on strength in 1945.

Modern era Notables:

Major (Retd) Edson Warner, CD QM5 [Sherbrooke Regiment, 7th/11th Hussars, Sherbrooke Hussars 1949 – 1973] – Canadian Olympian, rifle and pistol shooter, member of Canadian Forces Sports Hall of Fame, Dominion of Canada Rifle Association Target Rifle and Service Rifle Halls of Fame.
Hon. David Price, P.C. MP [Sherbrooke Regiment 1959 – 1965] – elected Member of Parliament for Compton Stanstead.  Elect Progressive Conservative 2 June 1997 to 13 September 2000; sat as Liberal 14 September to 27 November 2000; reelected 27 November 2000 to 27 June 2004 (7 years 26 days).  Mayor of Lennoxville (1989–97) and Counsellor for the Borough of Lennoxville in Sherbrooke (2009 to 2017).

Order of precedence
Sixth of 18 Canadian reserve armoured regiments.

References

Further reading
The Royal Canadian Armoured Corps, an illustrated history, by John Marteinson and Michael R McNorgan, published by the Royal Canadian Armoured Corps Association, 2000.  
The Postwar Sherman in Canadian Service by Rod Henderson, Service Publications, Ottawa, 2012 
'Hughes, David The British Armies in World War Two: An Organisational History Volume Six: The Canadian Army (The Nafziger Collection, Inc., West Chester, OH, 2003) 
Lieutenant-Colonel H.M. Jackson, The Sherbrooke Regiment (12th Armoured Regiment), (n.p., 1958). Limited print run.
Garneau, Grant, The Royal Rifles of Canada in Hong Kong, 1941–1945, Baird O'Keefe Pub Inc, (Sherbrooke, 2001), 
List of military operations in the West European Theater during World War II by year#Western Front
Official History of the Canadian Army in the Second World War, Volume III, THE VICTORY CAMPAIGN
The Operations in North-West Europe 1944–1945 by CP Stacey 
War Diaries held by Library and Archives Canada "27th Armoured Regiment" reels 14823 (1940 and 1941), 14824 (1940 and 1941); 14825 (1942 and 1943), 14826 (1943 and 1944), 14827(1943 and 1944), 14828 (1944 and 1945), 14829 (1945) and 14830 (1945).  Not digitized or available on line as of May 2018.

External links

Audio recording of Normandy veterans Gary Gould
Armoured lineages and official history
Order of Precedence
Canadian War Museum

Sherbrooke Hussars
Military units and formations of Quebec
Military units and formations established in 1866
Organizations based in Sherbrooke
1866 establishments in Canada